Dinosaur Cove is a 2022 family adventure film about a boy who discovers dinosaur eggs and must protect them from a crazy scientist. It was written by Derrick Steele and directed by Daniel Knudsen. The movie was produced and distributed by Crystal Creek Media.

Plot 
Riley Harrison is a young boy who stumbled across the unlikely discovery of dinosaur eggs near his grandfather’s oceanfront home. The eggs were laid by a pterodactyl that escaped from a secret genetics and animal cloning laboratory. A crazy scientist, who mistakenly released the dinosaur, must retrieve the specimen and the eggs that she has laid. He plans on using the animals as living targets for an exotic hunting preserve. Riley must protect the animals from the crazy scientist and look after the dinosaurs.

Cast 
 Brayden Eaton as Riley Harrison
 Jared Withrow as Wyatt Harrison
 Holly Houk as Dr. Theresa Starr
 James Pilachowski as Dr. Victor Vandersaurian
 Emily Buckner as Izzy Luther
 Addilyn Houk as Savannah Reeves
 Regan Miller as Mark Allen
 Cameron McCormick as Agent Russell
 Ray Morgis as Duke Harrison
 Daniel Knudsen as Dr. Terrance Walker

Production 
Young social media sensation Brayden Eaton was cast in the lead role of Riley Harrison. The film was directed by Daniel Knudsen who previously directed Courageous Love and ‘’SKYDOG’’. Dinosaur Cove wrapped up post-production in early 2022.

Release 
A trailer for ’’Dinosaur Cove’’ was released on January 28, 2022.  The movie was released on June 1, 2022, after some limited theatrical and targeted promotional screenings. The Dove seal of family approval was awarded to Dinosaur Cove by the Dove Foundation.

References

External links 
 Crystal Creek Media
 

2022 films
2020s children's adventure films
2020s teen films
Films about dinosaurs
American coming-of-age films
Films shot in Michigan
2020s English-language films
Films directed by Daniel Knudsen
2020s American films